American hip hop recording artist and music producer Big K.R.I.T. has released five studio albums, five extended plays (EP), fourteen mixtapes and 45 singles (including 24 as a featured artist) and three promotional singles.

Albums

Studio albums

Collaborative albums

Mixtapes

Compilation albums

EPs

Singles

As lead artist

As featured artist

Promotional singles

Other charted songs

Guest appearances

See also
 Big K.R.I.T. production discography
 List of songs recorded by Big K.R.I.T.

References

External links
 
 
 
 

Hip hop discographies
Discographies of American artists